Marian Foster (born 19 March 1948 in Newcastle upon Tyne) is an English television and radio presenter.

Foster was educated at Dame Allan's School, Newcastle upon Tyne. She was trained as a music teacher and sang with the London Symphony Chorus. She is most famous for presenting the BBC1 afternoon chat show Pebble Mill at One for fourteen years, from 1972 to 1986. Before that she was one of ITV's first women reporters. She was also a host on the BBC2 car show Top Gear. Later on television she fronted gardening reports for Look North. She worked in Ethiopia filming the results of Live Aid.
She has degrees in Geography and Education, working as a Geography teacher in both Newcastle and London.
On radio she has presented music programmes on BBC Radio 2 and BBC Radio 4 and is now a presenter on BBC Radio Newcastle, hosting the weekly gardening show on Sunday mornings alongside John Guy.

References

English television personalities
English television presenters
English radio DJs
1948 births
Living people
People educated at Dame Allan's School